States Election Commission (India) is an autonomous and Constitutional body constituted in States and Union Territories of India for ensuring that elections are conducted in free, fair and unbiased way. Constitution of India with provisions as per Article 324 safeguards the powers of Election Commission. States Election Commission in India are responsible for elections for Urban Local Bodies like Municipalities, Municipal Corporations, Panchayats and any other specified by Election Commission of India. They are appointed by Governor of state or union territory.

History and Administration 
 
State Election Commission in India for respective states were formed in accordance with powers of Election Commission of India, which was constituted in year 1950 to supervise state level elections. State election commissioner is appointed by Governor. To ensure the autonomy of the position the state election commissioner cannot be removed from office except on the grounds and manner specified for judge of High Court.

Powers and Responsibilities 

States Election Commission in India are responsible for the following:

 Conducting elections for Municipal Corporations in State.
 Conducting elections for Municipal panchayats in State.
 Model code of conduct implemented in elections for local bodies.
 Updating Electoral rolls with new additions.
 Updating Electoral rolls with removals, if any.

Composition 

State Election Commission consists of Chief Elector Officer and as many members and staff specified as are required by the Acts of respective state Governments. State Election Commissioners are independent persons not holding position or office in any Central or State Government organisations.

Constitutional Requirements 

State Election Commission was formed after amendment of Constitution with 73rd and 74th declaration. State Election Commissions were formed as per Article 243K of the Constitution, similar to setting up of Election commission of India as per Article 324.

Election Commission for States 

Following is the list of Election Commissions for each state in India:

Related Articles 

Election Commission of India.

References

External links 
 official website
 official website